CKVH-FM is a Canadian radio station that broadcasts a country music format at 93.5 FM in High Prairie, Alberta. The station is branded as Real Country 93.5 FM and was owned by Newcap Radio before they were bought out by Stingray Digital.

History
After being given CRTC approval in 1989, the station signed on in 1990 as a part of the Nor-Net Communications radio network, that operated stations throughout Alberta and Northern BC.

In September 2006, CKVH-AM switched from country (Cat Country) to classic hits (The Fox).

On 21 April 2009, Newcap Radio received CRTC approval to convert CKVH from 1020 AM to 93.5 FM. The FM switchover took effect on 15 October 2010.

On 15 October 2010, CKVH converted to the FM dial and became known as 93.5 Prairie FM. On 2 May 2014, CKVH-FM changed its format back to country but kept the Prairie FM brand.

In November 2016, CKVH rebranded under the Real Country brand, as with other Newcap-owned country stations in Alberta.

References

External links
Real Country 93.5 FM

Kvh
Kvh
Kvh
Radio stations established in 1990
1990 establishments in Alberta